1 Lacertae is a solitary star in the northern constellation of Lacerta. It is visible to the naked eye with an apparent visual magnitude of 4.15. Based upon measurements by the Hipparcos spacecraft, this star is located at a distance of roughly 620 light years. It is moving closer to the Earth with a heliocentric radial velocity of −8.6 km/s.

A stellar classification of K3 II-III suggests this is an evolved giant star/bright giant hybrid. It is 170 million years old with around four times the mass of the Sun and has expanded to an estimated 69 times the Sun's radius. The star is radiating 1,453 times the Sun's luminosity from its enlarged photosphere at an effective temperature of 4288 K, giving it the orange-hued glow of a K-type star. The star was once a suspected variable, but this was later rescinded.

References 

K-type giants
K-type bright giants
Lacerta (constellation)
BD+37 4526
Lacertae, 01
211388
109937
8498